On May 16, 2021, Representative Steve Stivers resigned from his seat in the United States House of Representatives to become president and CEO of the Ohio Chamber of Commerce. Following Stivers' official communication of his intent to resign, Ohio Governor Mike DeWine announced that the special election to fill the remainder of his term would be held on November 2, 2021, with the primary election held on August 3, concurrent with the special election in Ohio's 11th congressional district.  In the general election on November 2, Republican nominee Mike Carey defeated Democratic nominee Allison Russo by roughly 17 percentage points.

Republican primary

Candidates

Nominee
Mike Carey, vice president of government affairs at American Consolidated Natural Resources

Eliminated in primary
John Adams, owner of Green Valley Chemicals
Eric M. Clark, LPN at Wright-Patterson Air Force Base
Thad Cooperrider, former Perry County commissioner
Ruth Edmonds, advisory board member at Ohio's Office of Faith-Based and Community Initiatives
Ron Hood, former state representative
Thomas Hwang, owner of The Virtues Golf Club
Stephanie Kunze, state senator
Jeff LaRe, state representative
Bob Peterson, state senator
Omar Tarazi, attorney and Hilliard city councilmember

Withdrawn 

 Brian Stewart, state representative

Declined
Jeff Fix, Fairfield County commissioner

Endorsements

Polling

Results

Democratic primary

Candidates

Nominee
Allison Russo, state representative

Eliminated in primary
Greg Betts

Declined 
Tina Maharath, state senator
 Joel Newby, attorney and nominee for Ohio's 15th congressional district in 2020
Steve Patterson, mayor of Athens (endorsed Russo)
Michael Stinziano, Franklin County auditor

Endorsements

Results

General election

Predictions

Endorsements

Polling

Results

Counties that flipped from Republican to Democratic
Franklin (largest municipality: Columbus)

Notes

Partisan clients

References

External links
Mike Carey (R) for Congress
Allison Russo (D) for Congress

Ohio 2021 15
Ohio 2021 15
2021 15 Special
Ohio 15 Special
United States House of Representatives 15 Special
United States House of Representatives 2021 15